Cristián Alfaro (born September 8, 1987 in Salta) is an Argentine footballer who plays for Atlanta of the Primera B Argentine.

Titles
 The Strongest 2003 (Torneo Clausura)

References

 Profile at BDFA 

1987 births
Living people
Sportspeople from Salta Province
Argentine expatriate footballers
Argentine footballers
Club Atlético Huracán footballers
Chacarita Juniors footballers
Juventud Antoniana footballers
The Strongest players
Oriente Petrolero players
Santiago Wanderers footballers
Unión Temuco footballers
Expatriate footballers in Chile
Expatriate footballers in Bolivia
Association football forwards